Clash of Kings is a 1984 role-playing game adventure for Timemaster published by Pacesetter.

Contents
Clash of Kings is an adventure in which the player characters are sent back to 492 A.D. England in the time of Uther Pendragon.

Reception
Steve Crow reviewed Clash of Kings in Space Gamer No. 75. Crow commented that "Clash of Kings! is a must buy. While its compatibility with other time-travel games (such as Timeship) is low, an enterprising gamemaster might be able to adapt this module, or parts of it, to such games as Star Trek (perhaps replacing Demorans with Klingons) or Lords of Creation."

References

Role-playing game supplements introduced in 1984
Science fiction role-playing game adventures
Timemaster